Ricardo Oliveira de Sousa Trêpa (born 28 October 1972) is a Portuguese film actor. He has appeared in over 25 films and several TV shows since 1990. He is the grandson of Portuguese film director Manoel de Oliveira and has appeared in most of his grandfather's feature films since 1990.

He was previously married to Cláudia Jacques.

Selected filmography
 1990 No, or the Vain Glory of Command
 1991 The Divine Comedy
 1993 Abraham's Valley
 1994 The Box
 1996 Party
 1998 Anxiety
 1999 The Letter
 2000 Word and Utopia
 2001 I'm Going Home
 2001 Porto of My Childhood
 2002 The Uncertainty Principle
 2003 A Talking Picture
 2004 The Fifth Empire
 2005 Magic Mirror
 2006 Belle Toujours
 2007 Christopher Columbus – The Enigma
 2009 Eccentricities of a Blonde-haired Girl
 2010 The Strange Case of Angelica
 2012 Gebo et l'Ombre

References

External links

1972 births
Living people
Portuguese male film actors
People from Porto